Mohamed Bourouissa (born 1978) is an Algeria-born French photographer, based in Paris. In 2020 Bourouissa won the Deutsche Börse Photography Foundation Prize. His work is held in the collection of the Maison européenne de la photographie, Paris.

Early life
Bourouissa was born in Blida, Algeria. He  moved with his family to France when he was five years old and grew up in the suburbs of Paris.

Publications
Mohamed Bourouissa. Paris: Kamel Mennour, 2017. . With texts by Marc Donnadieu, Anna Dezeuze, Amanda Hunt, and Michael Nairn, and a transcript of a conversation between Bourouissa and Okwui Enwezor. In English and French. Exhibition catalogue.
Périphérique. London: Loose Joints, 2021. With essays in English and French by Taous R. Dahmani and Clément Chéroux. .

Exhibitions
Urban Riders, Musée d'Art Moderne de Paris, Paris, 2018
Free Trade, in a Monoprix supermarket, Rencontres d'Arles, Arles, France, 2019. Included work from Périphérique, Shoplifters, and Nous Sommes Halles.
The Photographers' Gallery, London, 2019/2020, as part of the Deutsche Börse Photography Foundation Prize

Awards
2012: Shortlisted, Prix Pictet, for Périphérique
2018: Shortlisted, Marcel Duchamp Prize, France
2020: Winner, Deutsche Börse Photography Foundation Prize 2020, an award of £30,000, for his exhibition Free Trade at Rencontres d'Arles. The other nominations were Clare Strand, Anton Kusters, and Mark Neville.

Collections
Bourouissa's work is held in the following permanent collection:
Maison européenne de la photographie, Paris

References

External links
Bourouissa at Kamel Mennour gallery

21st-century French photographers
French people of Algerian descent
People from Blida
1978 births
Living people
French contemporary artists
Algerian contemporary artists